Xenostephanus may refer to:
 preoccupied synonym (1963) of Zenostephanus, an ammonite genus
 Xenostephanus (mammal) (1962), a genus of notoungulates in the family Oldfieldthomasiidae